There are 29 stadiums in use by Single-A Minor League Baseball teams. The California League uses eight, the Carolina League uses 12, and the Florida State League uses nine. The oldest stadium is Jackie Robinson Ballpark (1914) in Daytona Beach, Florida, home of the FSL's Daytona Tortugas. The newest stadiums are Atrium Health Ballpark and Virginia Credit Union Stadium (2021), the respective homes of the Carolina League's Kannapolis Cannon Ballers in Kannapolis, North Carolina, and Fredericksburg Nationals in Fredericksburg, Virginia. One stadium was built in each of the 1910s and 1920s, four in the 1940s, one in each of the 1950s, 1960s, and 1980s, twelve in the 1990s, three in each of the 2000s and 2010s, and two in the 2020s. The highest seating capacity is 11,026 at George M. Steinbrenner Field in Tampa, Florida, where the FSL's Tampa Tarpons play. The lowest capacity is 2,468 at Valley Strong Ballpark in Visalia, California, where the California League's Visalia Rawhide play.

Stadiums

California League

Carolina League

Florida State League

Map

Gallery

California League

Carolina League

Florida State League

See also

List of Major League Baseball stadiums
List of Triple-A baseball stadiums
List of Double-A baseball stadiums
List of High-A baseball stadiums

References

General reference

Minor league baseball venues
Single-A
Single-A baseball stadiums